Jayce Hawryluk (born January 1, 1996) is a Canadian professional ice hockey player currently playing for the Utica Comets of the American Hockey League (AHL) while under contract to the New Jersey Devils of the National Hockey League (NHL). He was selected by the Florida Panthers in the second round (32nd overall) of the 2014 NHL Entry Draft.

Early life
Jayce was born January 1, 1996, in Yorkton, Saskatchewan, Canada. He has Ukrainian roots.

Hawryluk grew up in Roblin, Manitoba and was once featured on Hockey Day in Canada after becoming a "goal-scoring machine" in the Parkland Region of Manitoba.

Playing career
Hawryluk was selected by the Brandon Wheat Kings in the second round (32nd overall) of the 2011 Western Hockey League (WHL) Bantam Draft.  He has played with the Brandon Wheat Kings since the 2012–13 WHL season.
He had a 24-goal, 64-point season with the Wheat Kings in the 2013–14 season.

On March 1, 2016, Hawryluk was signed to a three-year entry-level contract with the Florida Panthers. Hawryluk would go on to finish fourth in WHL scoring with 106 points (47 goals, 59 assists) in just 58 games for the Wheat Kings. Hawryluk and the Wheat Kings would reach the WHL final for the second year in a row. A year after being swept by the Kelowna Rockets, Hawryluk would lead the charge in the fifth game of the series, recording 3 goals and 3 assists in a Brandon 8–4 win to capture the Ed Chynoweth Trophy. Hawryluk finished his Western Hockey League career with 119 goals, 159 assists for 278 points in 232 regular season games. He totaled 61 points (22 goals, 39 assists) in 45 career WHL Playoff games.

Hawryluk turned professional the following season after being assigned to the Panthers' American Hockey League affiliate, the Springfield Thunderbirds.

Hawryluk began the 2017–18 season in the AHL after being cut from Panthers training camp. He played most of the season in the AHL before being assigned the ECHL team, the Manchester Monarchs, on March 28, 2018.

Hawryluk again started the 2018–19 season in the American Hockey League with the Thunderbirds after being cut from training camp. However, after 25 games, Hawryluk was recalled to the NHL on December 15, 2018, alongside Henrik Borgström. He made his NHL debut that night against the Toronto Maple Leafs. Hawryluk scored his first two career NHL goals in a 6–3 win over the Chicago Blackhawks on December 23, 2018.

On July 15, 2019, Hawryluk accepted his qualifying offer from the Panthers, agreeing to a one-year, two-way contract.

During the following 2019–20 season, on February 17, 2020, Hawryluk was claimed off waivers from the Panthers by the Ottawa Senators. Added to the Senator's lineup, Hawryluk contributed with 2 goals and 7 points in only 11 games before the season was paused and abruptly ended for the Senators due to the COVID-19 pandemic.

As an impending restricted free agent and with the Senators undergoing a roster overhaul, Hawryluk was not tendered a qualifying offer, releasing him to free agency. On October 19, 2020, Hawryluk was signed to a one-year, two-way contract with the Vancouver Canucks. In the shortened  season, Hawryluk remained on the Canucks roster, making 30 appearances with the team in a checking-line role, registering 2 goals and 5 points as the club failed to return to the playoffs.

As a free agent from his lone season with the Canucks, Hawryluk paused his NHL career and opted to sign his first European contract in agreeing to a one-year deal with Swedish club, Skellefteå AIK of the Swedish Hockey League (SHL), on September 3, 2021.

After a successful tenure in the SHL, Hawryluk returned to North America and signed a one-year, two-way contract with former club, the Ottawa Senators, on July 25, 2022. Assigned to the AHL for the 2022–23 season, Hawryluk registered 3 goals and 8 points in 19 games. Without featuring for Ottawa, on March 10, 2023, Hawryluk was traded by the Senators to the New Jersey Devils in exchange for future considerations.

International play
Hawryluk was selected to play with Team Western Canada at the 2013 World U-17 Hockey Challenge, and he helped the Canadian squad win the gold medal at the 2013 Ivan Hlinka Memorial Tournament.  Hawryluk also helped Canada men's national under-18 ice hockey team capture the bronze medal at the 2014 IIHF World U18 Championships.

Career statistics

Regular season and playoffs

International

Awards and honours

References

External links

1996 births
Living people
Belleville Senators players
Brandon Wheat Kings players
Canadian expatriate ice hockey players in the United States
Canadian ice hockey centres
Canadian people of Ukrainian descent
Florida Panthers draft picks
Florida Panthers players
Ice hockey people from Saskatchewan
Manchester Monarchs (ECHL) players
Ottawa Senators players
Skellefteå AIK players
Sportspeople from Yorkton
Springfield Thunderbirds players
Vancouver Canucks players